Tumby may refer to:

Australia
 Tumby Bay, South Australia (previously known as Tumby), a town
 Tumby Island, an island in Tumby Bay in South Australia

England
 Tumby Woodside, Lincolnshire
 Tumby, Lincolnshire
 Tumby Moorside, Lincolnshire